is a feminine Japanese given name.

Possible writings
麗花, "beautiful, lovely, flower, petal"
怜華, "wise, beautiful, elegant"
令佳, "beautiful, rule, order, excellent"
麗夏, "beautiful summer"
玲花, "sound of jewels, flower"
冷菓, "chilled, cold, sweet, candy

People with the name
, Japanese actress and model
, Japanese artist
, Japanese badminton player
, Japanese actress
Reika Okina, Japanese singer known for singing the opening song to the anime Loveless
, Japanese professional wrestler, bodybuilder, singer and idol
, Japanese idol, singer and actress
, Japanese softball player

Fictional characters
Reika, a character in the OEL manga series Miki Falls
Reika (Jessica), a character in the anime series Stitch!
Reika, protagonist of the video game Time Gal
, a character in the anime series Smile PreCure!
, a character in the anime series Battle Skipper
Reika Chang (Vision), a character in the anime series Bubblegum Crisis
, a character in the manga series The Kindaichi Case Files
Reika Hazama, a character in the manga series Black Jack
, a character in the light novel series Good Luck! Ninomiya-kun
Reika Kuze, a character in the video game Fatal Frame III
, a character in the visual novel Harukoi Otome
, a character in the anime series RahXephon
Reika Nanjou, a character in the anime series Argevollen
, a character in the manga series Sailor Moon
, a character in the light novel series Fate/Apocrypha
, a character in the anime series Ginga e Kickoff!!
, a character in the manga series Majestic Prince
, a character in the anime series Invincible Steel Man Daitarn 3
, a character in the manga series Wolf Girl and Black Prince
, a character in the manga series Gantz
/Kamen Rider Sabela, a character in the Japanese tokusatsu drama, Kamen Rider Saber
, a character in the anime series Kaiju Girls
, a character in the visual novel Baldr Force
, a character in the manga series Fuuka
, a character in the anime series Serial Experiments Lain

Japanese feminine given names